The San Luis Obispo Pioneer was the first newspaper published in San Luis Obispo County, California, between January 1, 1868, and December 1869. It was a weekly, owned and edited by Rome G. Vickers.

Vickers began the newspaper by announcing that it would be nonpartisan, but in the 1868 presidential election, he endorsed the Democratic Party ticket headed by Horatio Seymour, thus losing support from Republicans and paving the way for the successful launch in 1870 of the San Luis Obispo Tribune, which is still being published.

Vickers, who came from New Orleans, Louisiana, was 26 years old when he began the four-page Pioneer. The newspaper was said to be racist in tone and Vickers' writing was "often reactive, mean, poorly sourced and boastful." After the paper folded, the publisher moved to San Francisco.

The Pioneer, did, however, publish the first newspaper extra in the county's history, concerning the destruction of the coastal steamer Sierra Nevada, which ran ashore north of Piedras Blancas, California, in 1869.

References

Weekly newspapers published in California
Newspapers established in 1868
Publications disestablished in 1869
1868 establishments in California
1869 disestablishments in California